Charlie Lynn Spradling (born September 27, 1968) is a retired American actress.

Early years 
Charlie Lynn Spradling was born September 27, 1968 in Forth Worth, Texas, where she was also raised.

Career 
Spradling's first appearance in film was in the 1988 science fiction horror cult film The Blob.

Mainly active throughout the 1980s and 1990s, Spradling is primarily known for her acting roles and appearances in horror films such as Meridian: Kiss of the Beast (1990), or Puppet Master II (1990). She has also had small appearances in the television series Twin Peaks and the film Wild at Heart (1990), both by David Lynch.

Personal life
Spradling married actor Jason London in 1997. The couple had a daughter, Cooper. They divorced in 2006.

Filmography

Film

Television

References

External links 
 

1968 births
Living people
American film actresses
American television actresses
20th-century American actresses
21st-century American actresses